District 13 is an electoral district in Malta.  It was established in 1976. Its boundaries have changed many times but it currently consists of the islands of Gozo and Comino.

Representatives

2017 General Election

References 

Districts of Malta